OP1 or OP-1 may refer to:

 Opus number 1
 Op. 1 (disambiguation), a list of  compositions that are assigned this number
 Bone morphogenetic protein 7 or BMP7, also known as osteogenic protein-1 or OP-1
 Pitcairn OP-1, a first rotary-wing aircraft
 Teenage Engineering OP-1, a portable synthesizer
 a clade in the Branching order of bacterial phyla (Rappe and Giovanoni, 2003)
 Rockchip RK3399, a Rockchip processor used in Chromebooks, marketed as OP1
 OP1 grade tea, see 
 OP1, the highest possible Overall Position (OP) that high school graduates can receive in Queensland, Australia